Soundarya is a 2007 Indian Kannada-language family drama film directed by Channagangappa and starring Ramesh Aravind, Sakshi Sivanand and Baby Shreya.

Cast 
Ramesh Aravind as Ramesh
Sakshi Sivanand as Soundarya
Baby Shreya as Varsha
Rahul Dev as Prakash
Gajar Khan as Johny

Production 
This film is about how land mafias affect innocent people. Ramesh Aravind plays a chemical engineer in the film.

Reception 
A critic from Sify wrote that "It is a feel good sentiments entertainer about relationships packaged with a lovely family, good music, neat performances and class cinematography.". A critic from Rediff.com said that "Soundarya is different from the run of the mill films you see every week, and will satisfy all those who like something new". A critic from Filmibeat opined that "Soundarya is a real surprise package from director Channagangappa". A critic from Nowrunning wrote that ""Soundarya' is a film for all the sections of the audience".

References